Philip "Phil" Francis Bates (born 19 June 1931) is an English jazz double bassist.

Bates was born in Brixton, London.  After playing regular gigs at London’s 51 Club with Harry Klein and Vic Ash throughout 1956, he joined The Jazz Couriers with Tubby Hayes and Ronnie Scott. After the Couriers disbanded, Bates toured with Sarah Vaughan and played with the Lennie Metcalfe Band on the Cunard liner the RMS Mauretania.
 
In the early 1960s he worked with Johnny Dankworth and Ronnie Ross, among others, before joining Dick Morrissey's Quartet from October 1962 until 1968. During that period he also played with the Harry South Big Band, as did the other members of the quartet, and with the Tony Kinsey Quintet. In 1968 he played briefly again with Tubby Hayes.

From 1968 on, he worked as a session musician, accompanying visiting US artists such as Sonny Stitt, Jimmy Witherspoon, Judy Collins and Tom Paxton, before spending five years touring Europe with Stéphane Grappelli in the late 1970s. In the 1980s and 1990s, he led his own trio and gave tuition.

References
John Chilton, Who's Who of British Jazz, 2004. Continuum International Publishing Group, 

1931 births
Living people
British jazz double-bassists
Male double-bassists
English jazz musicians
People from Brixton
21st-century double-bassists
21st-century British male musicians